Sthanarthi Saramma is a 1966 Indian Malayalam-language film, directed by K. S. Sethumadhavan and produced by T. E. Vasudevan. The film stars Prem Nazir, Sheela, Adoor Bhasi and Muthukulam Raghavan Pillai. It was released on 2 December 1966.

Plot

Cast 

Prem Nazir as Johny
Sheela as Saramma
Adoor Bhasi as Shasthrikal
Muthukulam Raghavan Pillai as Anthoni
Sankaradi as Chandi
T. R. Omana
Prathapachandran as Kuriachan
G. K. Pillai Thonniyedathu Thomachan
Joseph Chacko
Kunjandi as Gopala Pilla
Meena as Rosamma
Nellikode Bhaskaran as Velan Mathai
Panjabi as Variar
Pankajavalli as Mariyamma
 Santo Krishnan
 S.Shobha as Chinnamma

Soundtrack 
The music was composed by L. P. R. Varma and the lyrics were written by Vayalar Ramavarma.

References

External links 
 

1966 films
1960s Malayalam-language films
Films directed by K. S. Sethumadhavan